The Country Music Association Awards is a major awards show in country music. Formerly known as the Music Video of the Year Award, Video of the Year was originally presented at the 1985 Country Music Association Awards. The category honours excellence in country music videos that have been released during the eligibility years and is awarded to both the artist and the director. Below are the winners and nominees of the award.

In 1994, Martina McBride was the first female artist to win the Video of the Year Award and, in 2009, Trey Fanjoy became the first female director to win the award.

Recipients

{| class="wikitable sortable"
! bgcolor="#efefef" width=20px|Year          
! bgcolor="#efefef" width=200px|Winner
! bgcolor="#efefef" width=160px class=unsortable|Work
! bgcolor="#efefef" width=550px class=unsortable|Nominees
|-
!2022
|  Cody Johnson   Dustin Haney 
| "'Til You Can't"
|
 Taylor Swift, Chris Stapleton, Blake Lively - "I Bet You Think About Me"
 Midland, Jon Pardi, Harper Smith - "Longneck Way to Go"
 Cole Swindell, Lainey Wilson, Michael Monaco - "Never Say Never"
 Carly Pearce, Ashley McBryde, Alexa Campbell - "Never Wanted to Be That Girl"
|-
!2021
|  Kelsea Ballerini   Kenny Chesney   Patrick Tracy
| "Half of My Hometown"
|
 Maren Morris, Ryan Hurd, TK McKamy - "Chasing After You" 
 Chris Young, Kane Brown, Peter Zavadil - "Famous Friends"
 Dierks Bentley, Wes Edwards, Ed Pryor - "Gone"
 Brothers Osborne, Reid Long - "Younger Me"
|-
!2020
|  Miranda Lambert   Trey Fanjoy
| "Bluebird"
|
 Dan + Shay, Justin Bieber, Patrick Tracy - "10,000 Hours"
 Jake Owen, Justin Clough - "Homemade"
 Carly Pearce, Lee Brice, Sam Siske - "I Hope You're Happy Now"
 Chris Stapleton, David Coleman - "Second One to Know"
|-
!2019
|  Kacey Musgraves   Hannah Lux Davis
| "Rainbow"
|
 Dierks Bentley, Wes Edwards - "Burning Man"
 Maren Morris, Dave Meyers - "Girl"
 Blake Shelton, Sophie Muller - "God's Country"
 Eric Church, Reid Long - "Some of It"
|-
! scope="row" |2018
| Thomas Rhett   TK McKamy
| "Marry Me"
|
 Sugarland, Taylor Swift, Anthony Mandler - "Babe"
 Carrie Underwood, Randee St. Nicholas - "Cry Pretty"
 Chris Janson, Jeff Venable - "Drunk Girl"
 Dan + Shay, Patrick Tracy - "Tequila"
|-
! scope="row" |2017
| Brothers Osborne   Wes Edwards   Ryan Silver
| "It Ain't My Fault"
|
 Little Big Town, Becky Fluke, Reid Long - "Better Man"
 Keith Urban, Carter Smith - "Blue Ain't Your Color"
 Thomas Rhett, Maren Morris, TK McKamy - "Craving You"
 Miranda Lambert, Trey Fanjoy - "Vice"
|-
! scope="row" |2016
| Chris Stapleton   Tim Mattia
| "Fire Away"
|
 Cam, Trey Fanjoy - "Burning House"
 Tim McGraw, Wes Edwards - "Humble and Kind"
 Eric Church, Reid Long, John Peets - "Record Year"
 Dierks Bentley, Wes Edwards - "Somewhere on a Beach"
|-
! scope="row" |2015
| Maddie & Tae   TK McKamy
| "Girl in a Country Song"
|
 Kacey Musgraves, Marc Klasfeld - "Biscuits"
 Little Big Town, Kayla Welch, Matthew Welch - "Girl Crush"
 Miranda Lambert, Trey Fanjoy - "Little Red Wagon"
 Carrie Underwood, Raj Kapoor - "Something in the Water"
|-
! scope="row" |2014
| Dierks Bentley   Wes Edwards
| "Drunk on a Plane"
|
 Miranda Lambert, Trey Fanjoy - "Automatic"
 Lady Antebellum, Shane Drake - "Bartender"
 Kacey Musgraves, Honey - "Follow Your Arrow"
 Miranda Lambert, Carrie Underwood, Trey Fanjoy - "Somethin' Bad"
|-
! scope="row" |2013
| Tim McGraw   Taylor Swift   Keith Urban   Shane Drake
| "Highway Don't Care"
|
 Carrie Underwood, Randee St. Nicholas - "Blown Away"
 Blake Shelton, Pistol Annies, Trey Fanjoy - "Boys 'Round Here"
 Lady Antebellum, Peter Zavadil - "Downtown"
 Miranda Lambert, Trey Fanjoy - "Mama's Broken Heart"
 Little Big Town, Shane Drake - "Tornado"
|-
! scope="row" |2012
|  Toby Keith   Michael Salomon
| "Red Solo Cup"
|
 Kenny Chesney, Shaun Silva - "Come Over"
 Miranda Lambert, Trey Fanjoy - "Over You"
 Little Big Town, Declan Whitebloom - "Pontoon"
 Eric Church, Peter Zavadil - "Springsteen"
|-
! scope="row" |2011
| Kenny Chesney   Grace Potter   Shaun Silva
| "You and Tequila"
|
 Blake Shelton, Trey Fanjoy - "Honey Bee"
 The Band Perry, David McClister - "If I Die Young"
 Taylor Swift, Declan Whitebloom - "Mean"
 Brad Paisley, Alabama, Jim Shea - "Old Alabama"
|-
! scope="row" |2010
| Miranda Lambert   Trey Fanjoy
| "The House That Built Me"
|
 Blake Shelton, Trace Adkins, Roman White - "Hillbilly Bone"
 Lady Antebellum, David McClister - "Need You Now"
 Brad Paisley, Jim Shea - "Water"
 Miranda Lambert, Chris Hicky - "White Liar"
|-
! scope="row" |2009
| Taylor Swift   Trey Fanjoy
| "Love Story"
|
 Randy Houser, Eric Welch - "Boots On"
 Billy Currington, The Brads - "People Are Crazy"
 Brad Paisley, Keith Urban, Jim Shea - "Start a Band"
 George Strait, Trey Fanjoy - "Troubadour"
|-
! scope="row" |2008
| Brad Paisley   Andy Griffith   Jim Shea   Peter Tilden
| "Waitin' on a Woman"
|
 Kenny Chesney, Shaun Silva - "Don't Blink"
 Alan Jackson, Trey Fanjoy - "Good Time"
 Sugarland, Shaun Silva - "Stay"
 Trace Adkins, Peter Zavadil - "You're Gonna Miss This"
|-
! scope="row" |2007
| Brad Paisley   Jason Alexander
| "Online"
|
 Martina McBride, Robert Deaton, George Flanigen IV - "Anyway"
 Carrie Underwood, Roman White - "Before He Cheats"
 Emerson Drive, Steven Goldmann - "Moments"
 Kenny Chesney, Shaun Silva - "You Save Me"
|-
! scope="row" |2006
| Brooks & Dunn   Robert Deaton   George J. Flanigen IV
| "Believe"
|
 Big & Rich, Robert Deaton, George Flanigen IV, Marc Oswald - "8th of November"
 Carrie Underwood, Roman White - "Jesus, Take the Wheel"
 Miranda Lambert, Trey Fanjoy - "Kerosene"
 Brad Paisley, Dolly Parton, Jim Shea - "When I Get Where I'm Going"
|-
! scope="row" |2005
| Toby Keith   Michael Salomon 
| "As Good as I Once Was"
|
 Brad Paisley, Jim Shea - "Alcohol"
 Keith Urban, Wayne Isham - "Days Go By"
 Lee Ann Womack, Trey Fanjoy - "I May Hate Myself in the Morning"
 Gretchen Wilson, Robert Deaton, George Flanigen IV - "When I Think About Cheatin'"
|-
! scope="row" |2004
| Brad Paisley   Alison Krauss   Ricky Schroder
| "Whiskey Lullaby"
|
 Toby Keith, Michael Salomon - "I Love This Bar"
 Alan Jackson, Jimmy Buffett, Trey Fanjoy - "It's Five O'Clock Somewhere"
 Gretchen Wilson, David Hogan - "Redneck Woman"
 Alan Jackson, Trey Fanjoy - "Remember When"
|-
! scope="row" |2003
| Johnny Cash   Mark Romanek 
| "Hurt"
|
 Willie Nelson, Toby Keith, Michael Salomon - "Beer for My Horses"
 Brad Paisley, Peter Zavadil - "Celebrity"
 Martina McBride, Robert Deaton, George Flanigen IV - "Concrete Angel"
 Brooks & Dunn, Steven Goldmann - "Red Dirt Road"
|-
! scope="row" |2002
| Brad Paisley   Peter Zavadil 
| "I'm Gonna Miss Her (The Fishin' Song)"
|
 Alan Jackson, Steven Goldmann - "Drive (For Daddy Gene)"
 Toby Keith, Michael Salomon - "I Wanna Talk About Me"
 Travis Tritt, Michael Merriman - "Modern Day Bonnie and Clyde"
 Alan Jackson, Paul Miller - "Where Were You (When the World Stopped Turning)"
|-
! scope="row" |2001
| Sara Evans   Peter Zavadil 
| "Born to Fly"
|
 Lee Ann Womack, Greg Horne - "Ashes by Now"
 Trisha Yearwood, Chris Rogers - "I Would've Loved You Anyway"
 Jamie O'Neal, Lawrence Carroll - "There Is No Arizona"
 Alan Jackson, Morgan Lawley - "www.memory"
|-
! scope="row" |2000
| Dixie Chicks   Evan Bernard 
| "Goodbye Earl"
|
 Faith Hill, Lili Zanuck - "Breathe"
 Brad Paisley, Robert Deaton, George Flanigen IV - "He Didn't Have to Be"
 Toby Keith, Michael Salomon - "How Do You Like Me Now?!"
 Lee Ann Womack, Gary Wenner - "I Hope You Dance"
|-
! scope="row" |1999
| Dixie Chicks   Thom Oliphant 
| "Wide Open Spaces"
|
 Mark Wills, Jim Hershleder - "Don't Laugh at Me"
 Kenny Chesney, Martin Kahan - "How Forever Feels"
 Alan Jackson, Steven Goldmann - "I'll Go On Loving You"
 Tim McGraw, Faith Hill, Jim Shea - "Just to Hear You Say That You Love Me"
|-
! scope="row" |1998
| Faith Hill   Steven Goldmann 
| "This Kiss"
|
 Martina McBride, Robert Deaton, George Flanigen IV - "A Broken Wing"
 Jo Dee Messina, Jon Small - "Bye, Bye"
 George Strait, Christopher Cain - "Carrying Your Love with Me"
 Deana Carter, Roger Pistole - "Did I Shave My Legs for This?"
|-
! scope="row" |1997
| Kathy Mattea   Steven Goldmann 
| "455 Rocket"
|
 Pam Tillis, Steven Goldmann - "All the Good Ones Are Gone"
 Trace Adkins, Michael Merriman - "Every Light in the House"
 Tim McGraw, Faith Hill, Sherman Halsey - "It's Your Love"
 Deana Carter, Roger Pistole - "Strawberry Wine"
|-
! scope="row" |1996
| Junior Brown   Michael McNamara 
| "My Wife Thinks You're Dead"
|
 George Strait, John Lloyd Miller - "Check Yes or No"
 Vince Gill, John Lloyd Miller - "Go Rest High on That Mountain"
 Brooks & Dunn, Michael Oblowitz - "My Maria"
 Jeff Foxworthy, Alan Jackson, Coke Sams - "Redneck Games"
|-
! scope="row" |1995
| The Tractors   Michael Salomon 
| "Baby Likes to Rock It"
|
 Shania Twain, Charlie Randazzo - "Any Man of Mine"
 Alan Jackson, Piers Plowden - "I Don't Even Know Your Name"
 Garth Brooks, Jon Small - "The Red Strokes"
 Vince Gill, John Lloyd Miller - "When Love Finds You"
|-
! scope="row" |1994
| Martina McBride   Robert Deaton   George J. Flanigan IV
| "Independence Day"
|
 Reba McEntire, Linda Davis, Jon Small - "Does He Love You"
 Patty Loveless, Jim Shea - "How Can I Help You Say Goodbye"
 Garth Brooks, Jon Small - "Standing Outside the Fire"
|-
! scope="row" |1993
| Alan Jackson   Martin Kahan 
| "Chattahoochee"
|
 Pam Tillis, Michael Salomon - "Cleopatra, Queen of Denial"
 Vince Gill, John Lloyd Miller - "Don't Let Our Love Start Slippin' Away"
 George Jones, Marc Ball - "I Don't Need Your Rockin' Chair"
 John Anderson, Jim Shea - "Seminole Wind"
|-
! scope="row" |1992
| Alan Jackson   Jim Shea 
| "Midnight in Montgomery"
|
 Billy Ray Cyrus, Marc Ball - "Achy Breaky Heart"
 Travis Tritt, Jack Cole - "Anymore"
 Reba McEntire, Jack Cole - "Is There Life Out There"
 Vince Gill, John Lloyd Miller - "Look at Us"
|-
! scope="row" |1991
| Garth Brooks   Bud Schaetzle 
| "The Thunder Rolls"
|
 KT Oslin, Jack Cole - "Come Next Monday"
 Alan Jackson, Julien Temple - "Don't Rock the Jukebox"
 Reba McEntire, Jack Cole - "Fancy"
 The Judds, Bud Schaetzle - "Love Can Build a Bridge"
|-
! scope="row" |1990
| Garth Brooks   John Lloyd Miller
| "The Dance"
|
 Kentucky Headhunters, John Lloyd Miller - "Dumas Walker"
 Randy Travis, Mark Coppos - "He Walked on Water"
 Marty Stuart, Joanne Gardner - "Hillbilly Rock"
 Kathy Mattea, Jim May - "Where've You Been"
|-
! scope="row" |1989
| Hank Williams Jr.   Hank Williams Sr.   Ethan Russell
| "There's a Tear in My Beer"
|
 Rodney Crowell, Bill Pope - "After All This Time"
 Lorrie Morgan, Steven Buck - "Dear Me"
 Dolly Parton, Jack Cole - "Why'd You Come in Here Lookin' Like That"
 Nitty Gritty Dirt Band, Bill Pope - "Will the Circle Be Unbroken: Volume II"
|-
! scope="row" |1988
| colspan=3| Not Awarded
|-
! scope="row" |1987
| Hank Williams Jr.   ''Bill Fishman| "My Name is Bocephus"
|
 Michael Martin Murphey, Michael Merriman - "A Long Line of Love"
 Randy Travis, Jack Cole - "Forever and Ever, Amen"
 The O'Kanes, Bill Pope - "Oh Darlin'"
 Reba McEntire, Jon Small - "What Am I Gonna Do About You"
|-
! scope="row" |1986
| George Jones   Marc Ball 
| "Who's Gonna Fill Their Shoes"
|
 Gary Morris, Ethan Russell - "100% Chance of Rain"
 The Judds, David Hogan - "Grandpa (Tell Me 'Bout the Good Old Days)"
 Dwight Yoakam, Sherman Halsey - "Honky Tonk Man"
 Reba McEntire, Jon Small - "Whoever's in New England"
|-
! scope="row" |1985
| Hank Williams Jr.   John Goodhue| "All My Rowdy Friends Are Coming Over Tonight"
|
 Waylon Jennings, David Hogan - "America"
 Ricky Skaggs, Martin Kahan - "Country Boy"
 The Highwaymen, Peter Israelson - "Highwayman"
 Gary Morris, Mark Rezyka - "Second Hand Heart"
|-
|}

Category facts
ArtistsMost WinsDirectorsMost Wins'''

References

Country Music Association Awards